Georges Pichard (17 January 1920 – 7 June 2003) was a French comics artist, known for numerous  magazine covers, serial publications and albums, stereotypically featuring partially exposed voluptuous women.

Biography

A native of Paris, he was educated at the École des Arts Appliques, and after World War II worked as illustrator in advertising before publishing his first cartoon strip in La Semaine de Suzette in 1956, featuring a "girl next-door" character named Miss Mimi.

In the early 1960s he met Jacques Lob, with whom he collaborated on the superhero parodies Ténébrax and Submerman. Ténébrax was first published in the short-lived Franco-Belgian comics magazine Chouchou, and continued its serial run in Italian magazine Linus. In 1967, Submerman was serialised in Pilote magazine, but after a few years Pichard left the family friendly comics genre entirely.

Having collaborated with Danie Dubos on the more daring Lolly-strip which was serialised in Le Rire in 1966, Pichard and Lob began work within the erotic genre of comics as Blanche Épiphanie started serial publication in V Magazine in 1968. There was significant public reaction as this character acted outside the moral boundaries of the times, and at one point emulated Jane Fonda by going to Vietnam. This period saw Pichard develop his style of shaping his female heroines into tall, well-endowed women with excessive eyeliner make-up to create a gothic appearance.

Pichard continued to push the moral boundaries when he collaborated with Georges Wolinski to create a yet more controversial series featuring an eponymous character, Paulette, which began serial publication in Charlie Mensuel in 1970. This development became a target of right-wing politicians of that period, Jean Royer and Michel Debré. Continuing in this genre,  Pichard reunited with Danie Dubos to produce Caroline Choléra which was serialised in L'Écho des savanes in 1975. Upon the publication in 1977 of Marie-Gabrielle de Saint-Eutrope, a work almost entirely devoted to sexualized sadism, the explicit nature of Pichard's work led to a ban from bookshops and kiosks.

Less scrutinized for its erotic emphasis are the collaborations Pichard did with science-fiction author Jean-Pierre Andrevon, La Reserve and Édouard from 1974 and Ceux–là from 1977, published in Charlie Mensuel.

Toward the end of his life, Pichard adapted classic erotic stories such as Les Exploits d'un jeune Don Juan by Guillaume Apollinaire, The Kama-Sutra by Vatsyayana, Trois filles de leur mère by Pierre Louÿs, La Religieuse by Denis Diderot and Germinal by Émile Zola.

Bibliography

 La perfection chrétienne (2013, Glénat)   -->

Sources

 Georges Pichard publications in Pilote, Charlie Mensuel, L'Écho des Savanes and Circus BDoubliées 
 Georges Pichard albums Bedetheque 

Footnotes

External links
 Georges Pichard biography on Lambiek Comiclopedia

1920 births
2003 deaths
Fetish artists
French comics artists
French erotic artists
Artists from Paris